Basilisk Peak is, at , the highest peak marking the crater rim of Bellingshausen Island, South Sandwich Islands. The name as applied by the UK Antarctic Place-Names Committee in 1971 "marks the aura of this savage cliff which falls abruptly into a deep and steaming crater where the basilisk of legend might properly have his den."

References
 

Mountains and hills of South Georgia and the South Sandwich Islands